Guru Shama Bhate (Marathi: शमा भाटे)(born 6 October 1950) also known as Shama Tai, is among the Kathak exponents in India today. Her career spans over 40 years and she has been learning and performing Kathak from the age of 4 and has been a teacher and is involved with choreography and training many Kathak dancers in India. She is also the artistic director of her Dance Academy Nadroop in Pune

Personal life
Guru Shama Bhate was born in Belgaum (now Belagavi) on 6 October 1950. Born to Smt Gulab Baisa Naik and Sri Ganagadhar G Naik. She is married to Sanat Bhate, who is the son of Guru Rohini Bhate, in 1974 and has a son Angad Bhate.

Training
Shama Bhate is the disciple and daughter in law of Guru Smt. Rohini Bhate. She has also had her training from Pt. Birju Maharaj and Pt. Mohanrao Kallianpurkar. Her idiom of kathak dance has special inputs in ‘Taal’ and ‘Laya’, from tabla taal maestro and exponent Pt. Suresh Talwalkar.

Shama Bhate has trained numerous professional Kathak Dancers and is on the board of many universities and functions as one of the senior Guru’s in Lalit Kala Kendra of Pune University, Nalanda College of Mumbai University, Bharat College of Nagpur University, Bharati Vidyapeeth in Pune. Under her guidance, more than thirty of her students have acquired a post-graduate degree from various universities and as many as 12 students have been awarded the HRDC National scholarship (for senior students), and also CCERT scholarship (for junior students)

Choreographic work
Shama Bhate’s choreographic work is extensive. She has experimented with both traditional as well as contemporary format of Kathak. She has created a repertoire of traditional and classical compositions –Taals, Taranas, Thumris etc. with her own perspective. For instance, Trishul (a blend of Taal cycles of 9, 10 and 11 beats); Samvaad (domuhi composition), Layasopan (traditional Kathak sequence presented through Panch Jatis). A more recent production from 2015 saw her drawing inspiration from the Indian Epic Mahabaratha and created the "Ateet ki Parchhaiyan - Reflections on the Mahabharata Saga" with dancers performing 7 different Indian classical and Indian folk dance forms. Another choreography that was performed by her students from Nadroop during the occasion of the 85th birthday celebration of the singer Lata Mangeshkar, was the dance ballet 'Chala Vahi Des'.
Some of her most recent production in 2018 are

1. Chaturang Ki Chaupal - this production introduces the four components of Chaturang-Sahitya, Sargam, nach ke Bol and Tarana in four Ragas intricately woven together with music showcasing the richness of this production.

2. Echoes - Shama Tai's latest choreography is inspired by the Inner Voice and focuses on bhaav and abhinaya through the medium of five stories 
Guru Shama Bhate also organizes and curates the Madame Menaka Choreography Movement, a proverb based choreography festival which happens on an annual basis in Pune.

Awards and honours 

 Maharashtra Rajya Puraskar – 2011 conferred by the Maharashtra State Government.
Kala Darpan Puraskar in 2012.
 Kala Samvardhan Puraskar by Krishna Mulgur Smriti Pratishthan, 2012.
Kala Gaurav Puraskar by Kalanidhi, 2013.
Rohini Bhate Puraskar by the Pune Municipal Corporation, 2018.
Y.U.V.A Puraskar on International Women’s Day, 2018 for her invaluable contribution to Kathak.
Nehru Yuva Kendra Puraskar - Krida mantralaya. 2018.
Shri Kundanlal Gangani Award, 2019.

See also
 List of Kathak dancers

References

External links
 https://www.wikipedia-saswati-sen.com//

 https://www.youtube.com/watch?v=i8UubntiViE//

 https://www.thehindu.com/entertainment/dance/shama-bhate-on-her-artistic-journey/article17475803.ece//

 http://www.rotarypeace.in/chala-wahi-des//

1950 births
Kathak exponents
Artists from Pune
Indian dance teachers
Performers of Indian classical dance
20th-century Indian dancers
Indian female classical dancers
Living people
Dancers from Maharashtra
Women artists from Maharashtra
20th-century Indian women artists
Recipients of the Sangeet Natak Akademi Award